Penaherreraus is a genus of beetles in the family Cerambycidae, containing the following species:

 Penaherreraus batesi Tavakilian & Peñaherrera-Leiva, 2003
 Penaherreraus bilineatus (Aurivillius, 1921)
 Penaherreraus centrolineatus (Bates, 1862)
 Penaherreraus guyanensis (Tavakilian & Peñaherrera-Leiva, 2003)
 Penaherreraus pradosiae (Tavakilian & Peñaherrera-Leiva, 2003)
 Penaherreraus pubicornis (Audinet-Serville, 1835)
 Penaherreraus sarryi (Tavakilian & Peñaherrera-Leiva, 2003)

References

Acanthoderini